Iraqi Democrats Against Occupation (formerly Iraqi Democrats Against War and Sanctions) is an Iraqi political organisation founded to oppose United States-sponsored economic sanctions. It has now turned its focus to the current occupation of Iraq, calling for the immediate withdrawal of all foreign troops and the institution of a democratic government.

External links
Iraqi Democrats Against Occupation
Foreign relations of Iraq
Iraqi democracy movements
Political parties in Iraq